List of rivers in Sergipe (Brazilian State).

The list is arranged by drainage basin from north to south, with respective tributaries indented under each larger stream's name and ordered from downstream to upstream. All rivers in Sergipe drain to the Atlantic Ocean.

By Drainage Basin 

 São Francisco River
 Betume River (Poxim River)
 Salgado River
 Capivara River
 Cachorro River
 Campos Novos River
 Jacaré River
 Sapucaia River
 Japaratuba River
 Siriri River
 Sergipe River
 Poxim River
 Poxim Mirim River
 Poxim Açu River
 Pomonga River
 Parnamirim River
 Do Sal River
 Cotinguiba River
 Jacarecica River
 Jacoca River
 Cágado River
 Da Campanha River
 Salgado River
 Das Lajes River
 Socavão River
 Vaza-Barris River
 Santa Maria River
 Pitanga River
 Salgado River
 Piauí River
 Indiaroba River
 Pagão River
 Fundo River
 Piauitinga River
 Arauá River
 Jacaré River
 Real River
 Itamirim River
 Jabiberi River

Alphabetically 

 Arauá River
 Betume River (Poxim River)
 Cachorro River
 Cágado River
 Da Campanha River
 Campos Novos River
 Capivara River
 Cotinguiba River
 Fundo River
 Indiaroba River
 Itamirim River
 Jabiberi River
 Jacaré River
 Jacaré River
 Jacarecica River
 Jacoca River
 Japaratuba River
 Das Lajes River
 Pagão River
 Parnamirim River
 Piauí River
 Piauitinga River
 Pitanga River
 Pomonga River
 Poxim Açu River
 Poxim Mirim River
 Poxim River
 Real River
 Do Sal River
 Salgado River
 Salgado River
 Salgado River
 Santa Maria River
 São Francisco River
 Sapucaia River
 Sergipe River
 Siriri River
 Socavão River
 Vaza-Barris River

References
 Map from Ministry of Transport
  GEOnet Names Server

 
Sergipe